Celltrion, Inc. is a biopharmaceutical company headquartered in Incheon, South Korea. Celltrion Healthcare conducts worldwide marketing, sales, and distribution of biological medicines developed by Celltrion. Celltrion's founder, Seo Jung-jin, is the richest person in South Korea.

History
In 1999, Nexol, Inc. (now Celltrion Healthcare Co., Ltd.) was founded as a global business management consulting firm. In 2002, Celltrion, Inc. was founded as a biopharmaceutical company. 

In 2008, Nexol and Celltrion established a global distribution agreement.

In 2009, distribution channels were established in America, Oceania, Europe (Hospira) and Nexol, Inc. renamed as Celltrion Healthcare Co., Ltd. 

In 2010, distribution channels were established in Japan (Nippon Kayaku), Commonwealth of Independent States (CIS), Eastern Europe, and the Middle East (Egis). 

In 2013, distribution channels were added in Europe (Mundipharma, Biogaran, and Kern).

Products
The company's products are manufactured at mammalian cell culture facilities designed and built to comply with the United States FDA’s cGMP, and the European Medicines Agency’s GMP standards.

Inline product
Remsima (infliximab) is a biosimilar monoclonal antibody against tumor necrosis factor alpha (TNF-α), approved by the European Medicines Agency (EMA) for treatment of:
 rheumatoid arthritis,
 adult Crohn's disease,
 pediatric Crohn's disease,
 ulcerative colitis,
 pediatric ulcerative colitis,
 ankylosing spondylitis,
 psoriatic arthritis, and
 psoriasis.

In 2012 Remsima was approved by the Republic of Korea's Ministry of Food and Drug Safety (MFDS), previously known as Korea Food and Drug Administration and in 2013 it became the world's first biosimilar monoclonal antibody (mAb) approved by the EMA.

Herzuma is a biosimilar trastuzumab approved by the MFDS for treatment of early and advanced (metastatic) HER2+ breast cancer as well as advanced (metastatic) stomach cancer. Herzuma is a HER2+ breast cancer therapy designed to treat aggressive HER positive metastatic and adjuvant breast cancer, as well as HER2 positive adenocarcinoma of the stomach that has spread (metastatic or advanced gastric cancer).

Truxima (previously known as CT-P10) is the first biosimilar of the reference monoclonal antibody rituximab that targets CD20 molecule primarily found on the surface of B-cells. Its target indications are rheumatoid arthritis, non-Hodgkin lymphoma and chronic lymphocytic leukemia. It was approved by the EMA in February 2017.

See also
 List of pharmaceutical companies

References

External links
 

Pharmaceutical companies of South Korea
Life sciences industry
Companies based in Incheon
Biotechnology companies established in 1999
Biotechnology companies of South Korea
South Korean brands
South Korean companies established in 1999
Companies listed on the Korea Exchange